Palace Music (April 12, 1981 – January 7, 2008) was an American Thoroughbred racehorse and a Champion sire who won Group/Grade 1 stakes in both Europe and the United States.

Background
Bred by Walter J. Salmon, Jr. at his Mereworth Farm in Lexington, Kentucky, he was sired by Northern Dancer's son, The Minstrel. His dam was Come My Prince, a daughter of Prince John, whom The Bloodhorse magazine called "one of the greatest broodmare sires of all time."

Purchased and raced by Nelson Bunker Hunt and Bruce McNall's Summa Stable, he was conditioned for racing on turf in France by Patrick Biancone.

Racing career
At age three Palace Music won the Group 3 Prix Daphnis at Longchamp Racecourse in Paris. In the fall he won the Group 1 Champion Stakes at Newmarket Racecourse in England. As a four-year-old, Palace Music's only significant win in 1985 came in the Group 3 La Coupe de Maisons-Laffitte at Maisons-Laffitte Racecourse. Sent to the United States for the November 2, 1985 Breeders' Cup Mile, hosted that year by Aqueduct Racetrack, Palace Music finished second to Cozzene but was disqualified for interference and placed ninth.

Palace Music remained in the United States, Allen E. Paulson acquired an interest in Palace Music from Bruce McNall. Turned over to American Hall of Fame trainer Charlie Whittingham, in 1986 the then five-year-old Palace Music won three stakes races on turf in California and came from fifteen lengths back to finish second by a head to Last Tycoon in the November 1, 1986 Breeders' Cup Mile hosted by Santa Anita Park in California. Shipped east to Maryland, two weeks later Palace Music finished third to long-shot winner Lieuenant's Lark in the Washington, D.C. International Stakes at Laurel Park Racecourse.

Stud record
Retired from racing having won or placed in fourteen group/graded stakes races, in 1987 Palace Music stood at stud at Nelson Bunker Hunt's Bluegrass Farm near Lexington, Kentucky. The following year, he stood at Allen Paulson's Brookside Farms near Versailles, Kentucky. He remained there through the 1990 breeding season, after which he was sent to Segenhoe Stud in New South Wales, Australia, and later to Rangal Park Stud in Victoria.

Overall, Palace Music sired more than 400 winners, of which 33 were stakes race winners. He was also the damsire of 39 stakes winners. During his time at stud in the United States, he sired U.S. Racing Hall of Fame inductee Cigar. A 1990 foal, beginning in 1994 Cigar won sixteen consecutive races, tying the record set by Citation in 1949. His wins included the 1995 Breeders' Cup Classic and the Dubai World Cup. The two-time American Horse of the Year retired the richest horse in the history of world Thoroughbred racing with earnings of US$9,999,815.

Palace Music also met with considerable success as a shuttle stallion between Australia and New Zealand. Among the notable runners he sired were Group One winners Ready To Explode, Anthems, and Naturalism, a multi-millionaire whose wins included the Group One Australian Derby (1992), Rosehill Guineas (1992), and Caulfield Stakes (1993). Another son, Palace Line, earned Champion honors racing in South Africa and in Singapore.

Pensioned in January 2005,  on January 7, 2008 twenty-seven-year-old Palace Music was humanely euthanized at Rangal Park Stud.

References

 Palace Music's pedigree and partial racing stats

1981 racehorse births
2008 racehorse deaths
Racehorses bred in Kentucky
Racehorses trained in France
Racehorses trained in the United States
United States Champion Thoroughbred Sires
Thoroughbred family 13-b